Robert Thirlwell is an American sound engineer. He was nominated for three Academy Awards in the category Best Sound.

Selected filmography
 Outland (1981)
 The River (1984)
 Back to the Future (1985)

References

External links

Year of birth missing (living people)
Living people
American audio engineers